is a former tennis player from Japan. In May 1988, Tsuchihashi achieved a career-high singles ranking of World No. 359.  He proceeded to represent his native country at the 1988 Summer Olympics in Seoul, where he was defeated by Mexico's Agustín Moreno in the first round. In October 1989, he became a quarterfinals of the 1989 ATP Challenger Series.

External links

1966 births
Living people
Japanese male tennis players
Olympic tennis players of Japan
People from Kagoshima
Sportspeople from Kagoshima Prefecture
Tennis players at the 1988 Summer Olympics
Tennis players at the 1990 Asian Games
Asian Games competitors for Japan
20th-century Japanese people